Henny Noremark (born 23 May 1942) is a Swedish production designer and costume designer. She was co-nominated with Karin Erskine for the Academy Award for Best Costume Design for their work in Ingmar Bergman's film The Magic Flute (1975).

Career 
Henny Noremark, who came from central Sweden, attended the Konstfackskolan in Stockholm from 1960 to 1965 and received extensive artistic training there. Henny Noremark then received further training in production design at Swedish television in 1967/68 and further training at the same place as a producer in 1970/71. Finally, she rounded off her training in 1980–82 with a course in film and television directing at the Dramatiska Institutet in Stockholm.

Henny Noremark began working as a costume and set designer on the series Söderkåkar (1970) while still training for Swedish television. Her next television job brought her together with Sweden's star director Ingmar Bergman in 1974: Noremark also designed both the costumes and the scenery for his production of Mozart's Magic Flute. The artist received an Oscar nomination for the first performance in 1976, together with Karin Erskine. After 1977, Henny Noremark concentrated on her work as a film architect and remained active in this area until the late 2000s, without specific individual achievements particularly standing out.

Henny Noremark, née Haskel, also supervised various theatrical productions, including the plays Siri Brahe, Hur andra älskar, Gröna Hissen, Immanuel Kant's sista dagar and Shakespeare's A Midsummer Night's Dream, both as a costume and set designer. Exhibitions of her designs can be seen in the Judiska Museet, Stockholm (permanent exhibition), the Graphics Hus, Mariefred, and in the Kunstakademien (Art Academy) in Stockholm.

References

External links 

 Official website

Swedish production designers
Swedish costume designers
1942 births
Living people
Women production designers